The 2021 season is Lalitpur City's 1st Nepal Super League season.

Season overview

On 15 March, Lalitpur City announced the signing of Nepal national football team striker Anjan Bista as its marquee player.

On the auction of Nepal Super League, Lalitpur City acquired various players such as midfielder Arik Bista, Kamal Shrestha, Prabesh Danawar, etc.

On 11 April, Lalitpur City signed contract with Vilim Posinković.

On 16 April, Lalitpur City signed contract with Nurlan Novruzov.

Competition

Nepal Super League

Results

League table

Playoffs

Bracket

Preliminary

Statistics

Goalscorers 
Includes all competitive matches. The list is sorted alphabetically by surname when total goals are equal.

Awards

NSL Super Forward of the League

References

External links
Nepal Super League 2021

Lalitpur City FC
Nepalese football clubs 2021 season
Nepal Super League